This is a list of urban agglomerations/cities and towns as per 2011 census in the Indian state of Himachal Pradesh. Dharamshala , Solan, Palampur, and Mandi became municipal corporations after 2011 census hence their area has been expanded resulting in a change of population, which has been updated as recent one.

Most of the cities and towns appear to have larger population than the above mentioned figures due to rapid outgrowth in the recent years. For example, Baddi has emerged as one of the largest cities considering rapid industrialisation and urbanisation in the past decade. While, its official figures state its population to be around 29,911  as per 2011; the actual urban agglomerations population is around 100,000 since official figure takes into account only the notified part of the city as urban population. Apparently, urban agglomerations have significantly more population than the official figure. This holds true for most of the cities and town listed here when population of suburbs of respective city or town is added.

Urban Agglomeration
In the census of India 2011, an Urban Agglomeration has been defined as follows:

"An urban agglomeration is a continuous urban spread constituting a town and its adjoining outgrowths (OGs), or two or more physically contiguous towns together with or without outgrowths of such towns. An Urban Agglomeration must consist of at least a statutory town and its total population (i.e. all the constituents put together) should not be less than 20,000 as per the 2001 Census. In varying local conditions, there were similar other combinations which have been treated
as urban agglomerations satisfying the basic condition of contiguity."

Constituents of Urban Agglomerations in the Himachal Pradesh
The constituents of Urban Agglomerations in the Himachal Pradesh, with a population of 1 lakh or above, are noted below:

Shimla UA includes Shimla (M Corp.).

Abbreviations: M Corp. = Municipal Corporation, M = Municipality, CT = Census Town, OG = Out Growth, NA = Notified Area, CB = Cantonment Board

Urban Agglomeration constituents
Urban Agglomerations constituents with a population above 100,000 as per 2011 census are shown in the table below.

References

Cities and towns in Himachal Pradesh
Cities
Himachal Pradesh